Erkki Olavi Niemi (born 18 April 1962 in Vaasa) is a retired high jumper from Finland. He competed for his native country at the 1984 Summer Olympics, finishing in 9th place (2.24 metres).

References
 sports-reference

External links
 

1962 births
Living people
Sportspeople from Vaasa
Finnish male high jumpers
Olympic athletes of Finland
Athletes (track and field) at the 1984 Summer Olympics
20th-century Finnish people